Shirinchashma is a village and jamoat in Tajikistan. It is located in Tojikobod District, one of the Districts of Republican Subordination. Its population is 4,573 and its area is 84.2 km2.

References

Populated places in Districts of Republican Subordination
Jamoats of Tajikistan